Salimata Simporé (born 29 January 1987) is a Burkinabé footballer who plays as a forward for Belarusian Premier League club FC Minsk and the Burkina Faso women's national team.

Club career
Simporé played in Burkina Faso for Princesses in 2005 and 2015, for USFA in 2016 and for Etincelles in 2019. In October 2006, Simporé was registered as a player for Equatorial Guinean club Las Vegas.

International career
Between 2006 and 2010, Burkinabé-born Simporé used to play for Equatorial Guinea as a naturalized player, having integrated the Equatorial Guinea's squads that won the 2008 African Women's Championship and reached the second place in the 2010 African Women's Championship, which allowed Equatorial Guinea to qualify for the 2011 FIFA Women's World Cup. Around April 2011, Simporé was removed from national team by the Italian-born Brazilian coach Marcelo Frigerio, who had recently assumed, just a few months before participating in the World Cup, that Simporé was male. Since then, Simporé was never called-up by Equatorial Guinea.

Simporé was a member of the Burkina Faso women's national football team in 2007 (as their captain), scoring 8 goals, and 2018.

International goals
Scores and results list Equatorial Guinea's goal tally first

Scores and results list Burkina Faso's goal tally first

Gender controversy
Beyond the mechanism by which Simporé was naturalized by Equatorial Guinea, the main controversy arose regarding whether Simporé was actually a man. In 2015, Frigerio, now a former national team coach for Equatorial Guinea, told the Brazilian press Simporé is in fact a man.

Honors and awards

National team
Equatorial Guinea
Africa Women Cup of Nations: 2008

References

External links 
Salimata Simporé at CAF official website

1987 births
Living people
Sex verification in sports
Burkinabé women's footballers
Sportspeople from Ouagadougou
Women's association football forwards
Dual internationalists (women's football)
Burkina Faso women's international footballers
Equatorial Guinea women's international footballers
Burkinabé expatriate footballers
Burkinabé expatriates in Belarus
Expatriate women's footballers in Belarus
Burkinabé expatriates in Equatorial Guinea
Expatriate women's footballers in Equatorial Guinea
21st-century Burkinabé people